Overtrick was a champion U.S. standardbred racehorse who was memorable for his breaking of many existing world records and his classic duels with champion pacer Meadow Skipper.

Overtrick raced against crack pacers Meadow Skipper and Country Don in all three legs of the 1963 harness racing Triple Crown. In the first leg, Meadow Skipper thumped Overtrick in a track record time. In the second race of the series, the Little Brown Jug, Overtrick turned the tables on Meadow Skipper beating him in second with Country Don third, and at the same time breaking the world record. Overtrick repeated the performance in the Messenger Stakes with Country Don second and Meadow Skipper third.

See also
 Harness racing in America
 Cardigan Bay

References

American Standardbred racehorses
Harness racing in the United States
Little Brown Jug winners
Messenger Stakes winners